Writing Workshop is a method of writing instruction that developed from the early work of Donald Graves, Donald Murray, and other teacher/researchers who found that coaching students to write for a variety of audiences and purposes was more effective than traditional writing instruction. This approach has been popularized by Lucy Calkins and others involved in the Reading and Writing Project at Columbia University in New York City, New York. (Calkins, L (2006). A Guide to The Writing Workshop, Grades 3-5. Portsmouth, NH: First Hand). This method of instruction focuses on the goal of fostering lifelong writers. It is based upon four principles: students will write about their own lives, they will use a consistent writing process, they will work in authentic ways, and they will develop independence as writers. 

Writing Workshop is designed for use in all grade levels. Each grade level has specific units of study tailored to meet developmental and curricular needs. Students have a large amount of choice in their topic and style of writing. The teacher acts as a mentor author, modeling writing techniques and conferring with students as they move through the writing process. Direct writing instruction takes place in the form of a mini-lesson at the beginning of each workshop and is followed by a minimum of 45 minutes of active writing time. Each workshop ends with a sharing of student work.

Process 
Establishing a consistent writing process that the students work through is one of the main principles of the Writing Workshop. Each student moves through the process at his or her own rate, however it is best to set a deadline for each step so that each writing unit is completed in a timely manner. 

Possible timeline for workshop: 

Generating Ideas (1–2 days)
Collecting writing entries (5–10 days)
Choosing a seed idea (2–3 days)
Planning the draft (1–2 days)
Revising to change the content and quality (1–3 days)
Editing to improve grammar (1–2 days)
Publishing the piece to share it with the world (1–3 days)
Writing Celebration (1 day)

Structure of the Writing Workshop 
1. Signal the beginning of Writing Workshop
Use a consistent signal to begin workshop. Some ideas are chimes, a bell, turning on small Christmas lights, singing a song or using a special clap.
2. Direct, explicit mini-lesson (See mini-lesson information below).3. Writing time
During this time the teacher guides the young authors through writing conferences, meets with small groups to teach specific writing techniques and/or works one-on-one with authors. Students may also work with a partner during this time with teacher permission. 
4. Sharing of student work
Students that have tried out the concept from the mini-lesson are highlighted.

Mini-lessons
Mini-lessons should be about 10–15 minutes in length. Not all proponents of writing workshop include a mini-lesson, however, as some approaches incorporate the instruction into small-group or individual conferences. Calkins, however, recommends following the same structure each time: make a connection to a previous lesson, teach a new writing technique, and have the students practice the technique right there with your guidance.

Possible Mini-lesson topics are:
 using dialog to show an action
 stretching out actions
 adding internal thinking
 elaborating on physical descriptions
 starting a story with an action
 starting a story with dialog
 end with a sound
 using circular ending
 creating imagery through words
 narrowing a story, making it more focused
 choosing a seed idea
 creating a strong ending

Conferring
Lucy Calkins (1994) has described conferring as, “the heart of our teaching” (p. 189) in the Writing Workshop. Conferring in the Writing Workshop takes place during the time when students are actively writing.  The teacher circulates around the room, meeting with individual students or student groups to discuss their writing progress. The conferences are often short, typically lasting anywhere from two to seven minutes (Ray, 2001, p. 158). Calkins (1994) has described a three-step process for facilitating these conferences: “research, decide, teach” (p. 224). The teacher begins the conference by asking probing, open-ended questions to ascertain the student’s current focus in his/her writing work. Once the teacher has identified an area of need, the teaching can begin. The teaching often includes critical feedback for the student, a short time in which the student and teacher practice the new skill or strategy, and a link to how the new skill or strategy will improve the child’s future work as a writer (Anderson, 2000, p. 26). Another component of the conference is record keeping. The teacher, and sometimes also the student, can make anecdotal notes about the content of the conference.  This will allow the teacher to refer back to previous notes and monitor students’ growth as writers.

“The interesting thing is that in teaching writing, we often unmask our own processes in readers and writers, thinking aloud in front of our kids so they can learn how good readers and writers think about texts" (Calkins, Hartman, White, 2005, p. 62). The teacher knows it is important while facilitating the start of the conference to begin with a positive comment about the student’s writing piece. One way to get better on forming instructional needs is to take time to look at “student work outside of class time and thinking about the decision you might make for this student” (Calkins, Hartman, White, 2005, p. 62). Peter Elbow pioneered thinking about feedback through workshop approaches. 

International Writing Project instructors Allen Koshewa and Elly Tobin emphasize that teaching students how to respond to each other's work is also crucial. They recommend that a peer response session include providing feedback on the overall message, citing at least one strong point about the writing or its potential, and inviting the author to present concerns or questions.

Writing Workshop aligned with the Common Core
Although the National Writing Project and other organizations promoting workshop approaches favor an organic approach rather than a scripted one, the writing workshop approach has increasingly been commercialized. Lucy Calkins and her colleagues from The Reading and Writing Project at Teachers College have recently written a new guide called A Curricular Plan for the Writing Workshop (Heinemann, 2011). This aligns the units of study she has recommended in the past with the new Common Core State Standards.“ This curriculum reflects the genres for writing that are spelled out by the Common Core Standards and gives children several opportunities to write in those genres: narrative, persuasive, informational, and poetry.“ (p. 2 A Curricular Plan for the Writing Workshop). The new units demonstrate more of a focus on informational, persuasive writing, and revision than the original unit plan developed by Calkins. Written by grade level, this resource takes the school year month by month and guides teachers towards instructing with a balance of narrative and nonfiction writing. Minilesson ideas, additional resources and celebrations are discussed as well, with a focus towards “lifting the level of student work” in every unit.

Resources
Websites for additional information: 
 National Writing Project
 International Writing Project
 Reading and Writing Project at Teachers College

Books
 Anderson, C. (2000). How’s it going:  A practical guide to conferring with student writers. Portsmouth, NH: Heinemann.
 Calkins, L. (1994). The art of teaching writing (new ed.). Portsmouth, NH: Heinemann.
 Graves, D. (1994). A fresh look at writing. Portsmouth: NH: Heinemann.
 Units of Study for Teaching Writing, Grades K-2,2006, FirstHand Press
 Units of Study for Teaching Writing, Grades 3-5, 2006, FirstHand Press
 How Writers Work, Ralph Fletcher, 2000, HarperCollins
 Ray, K. W. (2001). The writing workshop: Working through the hard parts (and they’re all hard parts). Urbana, IL: National Council of Teachers of English.
 Calkins, L., Hartman, A.,& White, Z. (2005). "One to One". Portsmouth, NH: Heinemann.
 Calkins, L (2011). A Curricular Plan for the Writing Workshop. Portsmouth, NH: Heinemann.
 Kissel, B. (2017). When writers drive the workshop. Portland, ME: Stenhouse.
 Remembering Donald H. Graves - National Writing Project

References
 Anderson, C. (2000). How’s it going: A practical guide to conferring with student writers. Portsmouth, NH: Heinemann.
 Calkins, L. (1994). The art of teaching writing (new ed.). Portsmouth, NH: Heinemann.
 Calkins, L. (2006). A Guide to The Writing Workshop, Grades 3-5. Portsmouth, NH: First Hand.
 Calkins, L.  (2009). Retrieved May 1, 2009, from The Teachers College Reading & Writing Project.
 Meyer, R and K. Whitmore. (2014). Reclaiming Writing: Composing Spaces for Identities, Relationships, and Actions. New York: Routledge.
 Ray, K. W. (2001). The writing workshop:  Working through the hard parts (and they’re all hard parts). Urbana, IL: National Council of Teachers of English.
 Calkins, L.(2011). A Curricular Plan for the Writing Workshop. Portsmouth, NH. Heinmann.

Writing